Chris Edwards (6 May 1976 – 30 March 2018) was a British professional boxer who competed from 1998 to 2012. He held the British super flyweight title in 2007, the British flyweight title twice between 2009 and 2012, and the Commonwealth flyweight title from 2009 to 2010.

Career

The journeyman
Edwards made his professional debut in the Welsh town of Ebbw Vale in April 1998, beating Chris Thomas via a technical knockout in the second round. The victory was to be his last for the next two years. Fighting a further six times between September 1998 and September 2000 Edwards went on to lose on all six occasions. Despite his long run of defeats Edwards managed to stem the tide of defeat with two victories coming in October and November 2000 allowing him to end the year with a pro record of won three, lost six. The next year saw Edwards revert to the journeyman type with four fights resulting in a further two defeats against one draw and one win against Neil Read.

Read was also to prove Edwards solitary opponent throughout the whole of 2002 when in October of that year the two men met one more. Edwards picked up his fifth pro win (2nd against Read) with a points victory over six rounds at the Kings Hall in Stoke-on-Trent. Only one fight followed in 2003 with Edwards this time losing to future British and Commonwealth champion Lee Haskins in June again over six rounds.

In 2004, Edwards fought three times and scored a third victory over Neil Read to this time pick up the vacant Midlands Area super bantamweight title, the first professional title of his career. At the time of the contest for the belt Read had a combined record of 3-20-1 against Edwards 5-9-2. The contest which took place during September at the Kings Hall saw Edwards claim victory via technical knockout in the second round.  Further results during the year saw a draw against old foe Delroy Spencer in April and a defeat to future British title challenger Colin Moffett in October.

After the Moffett fight another period of inactivity followed for Edwards and he would not fight again until November 2005, meeting Delroy Spencer for the third time, this time scoring a points victory over four rounds. In February 2006 he lost to Gary Ford and then travelled to Italy in March 2006 to meet Andrea Sarritzu the reigning European champion in a non-title fight. It was the first time Edwards had travelled abroad to fight professionally and the fight ended with the champion knocking Edwards out in the fourth round.

The English champion
Edwards rebounded from his Italian adventure by scoring victories later in the year over novice fighters Gary Shiel and Usman Ahmed. The wins set Edwards up for a shot at the vacant English flyweight title against Huddersfield's former Commonwealth champion, Dale Robinson who entered the contest with a professional record of 19-2-1 making him a strong favourite to win considering Edwards' record of 9-12-1. The fight, at the Kings Hall, Stoke-on-Trent in November 2006 resulted in one of the upsets of the year with Edwards scoring a TKO in the eighth round to lift his second professional title and the English championship.

A rematch between the two fighters in April 2007 saw both fighters meet in Altrincham for the vacant British and Commonwealth flyweight titles. In one of the fights of the year, Edwards and Robinson battled to a draw over 12 rounds meaning that neither would leave with the belts. After the fight Robinson announced his retirement from the sport.

British and Commonwealth champion
Following the introduction of the super-flyweight division to British boxing, Edwards was mandated to fight for the inaugural British title against Doncaster's undefeated Jamie McDonnell. The fight, in December 2007, saw Edwards claim the title in another close fight-of-the-year contender with a split-decision victory.  His reign as champion was short-lived, however, as he lost the title in his first defence, against Andy Bell, in a 12-round fight.

Edwards fought once more for a title in January 2009, this time moving back down to flyweight to challenge once more for the still-vacant British and Commonwealth flyweight titles. The fight in Edwards' home town of Stoke against fellow challenger Wayne Bloy saw Edwards pick up both belts when Bloy retired hurt in the fourth round. On 29 May 2009, Edwards made the first defence of his new title with a 12-round decision over a man he had defeated previously, Derby's Usman Ahmed. Edwards lost the title, fighting in Bolton to Shinny Bayaar, a Mongolian fighter who had recently gained British nationality, making him eligible to the fight for the belt.

The loss against Bayaar had also meant the loss of Edwards' Commonwealth title, which, despite not being on the line, had to be given up following the defeat to another Commonwealth fighter. On 19 February 2010, he returned to Stoke-on-Trent to fight for the now-vacant belt, beating Namibian Abmerk Shindjuu in 12 rounds, winning 115-114 on each of the judges' scorecards. Edwards was victorious over Francis Croes in four rounds on 4 December 2010, and then regained the British title with a victory in a closely fought contest against Paul Edwards at the Olympia in Liverpool on 11 June 2011.  Edwards made a successful defence on 10 December 2011 over the man who had previously beaten him, Shinny Bayaar.

Death
On 30 March 2018, Edwards died of sudden arrhythmic death syndrome.

Professional boxing record

Titles
Information from the British Boxing Board of Control.

References

English male boxers
Flyweight boxers
Super-flyweight boxers
Sportspeople from Stoke-on-Trent
1976 births
2018 deaths